SJP may stand for:

São José do Rio Preto Airport, IATA code SJP, State of São Paulo, Brazil 
St James Park (Exeter), Exeter City Football Club stadium
St James' Park, Newcastle United Football Club (England) stadium
St James Park railway station, Devon, England, National Rail station code SJP
St. John's Preparatory School (Massachusetts), US
Saint John's Preparatory School (Minnesota), US
Sarah Jessica Parker, actress
Scottish Jacobite Party, a political party
Shijiazhuang railway station, China Railway, telegraph code SJP
Singapore Justice Party, a political party
Students for Justice in Palestine, a US student movement